Count of Lemos is a hereditary title in the Peerage of Spain accompanied by the dignity of Grandee, granted in 1456 by Henry IV to Pedro Álvarez Osorio, as a result of his marriage to Beatriz Enríquez de Castilla, a cousin of the king.

The title makes reference to the town of Monforte de Lemos in Lugo, Spain.

Counts of Lemos (1456)

 Pedro Álvarez Osorio, 1st Count of Lemos
 Rodrigo Enríquez Osorio, 2nd Count of Lemos
 Beatriz de Castro Osorio, 3rd Countess of Lemos
 Fernando Ruiz de Castro y Portugal, 4th Count of Lemos
 Pedro Fernández de Castro y Portugal, 5th Count of Lemos
 Fernando Ruiz de Castro Andrade y Portugal, 6th Count of Lemos
 Pedro Fernández de Castro y Andrade, 7th Count of Lemos
 Francisco Ruiz de Castro Andrade y Portugal, 8th Count of Lemos
 Francisco Fernández De Castro, 9th Count of Lemos
 Pedro Antonio Fernández de Castro, 10th Count of Lemos
 Ginés Fernando Ruiz De Castro y Portugal, 11th Count of Lemos
 Rosa María Fernández De Castro, 12th Countess of Lemos
 Joaquín López de Zúñiga y Castro, 13th Count of Lemos 
 Jacobo Fitz-James Stuart, 14th Count of Lemos
 Carlos Fitz-James Stuart y Silva, 15th Count of Lemos
 Jacobo Fitz-James Stuart y Stolberg-Gedern, 16th Count of Lemos
 Jacobo Fitz-James Stuart y Silva, 17th Count of Lemos
 Carlos Miguel Fitz-James Stuart y Silva, 18th Count of Lemos
 Jacobo Fitz-James Stuart y Ventimiglia, 19th Count of Lemos
 Carlos María Fitz-James Stuart y Portocarrero, 20th Count of Lemos
 Jacobo Fitz-James Stuart, 21st Count of Lemos
 Cayetana Fitz-James Stuart, 22nd Countess of Lemos
 Carlos Fitz-James Stuart, 23rd Count of Lemos

See also
List of current Grandees of Spain

References

Grandees of Spain
Counts of Spain
Lists of Spanish nobility
Noble titles created in 1456